Club Deportivo Huétor Vega is a Spanish football team located in Huétor Vega, in the autonomous community of Andalusia. Founded in 1927 it currently plays in Tercera División RFEF, holding home matches at Estadio Municipal Las Viñas, with a capacity of 1,800 spectators.

History 
CD Huétor Vega was founded in 1927.  On 28 June 2018 the club signed an affiliation agreement with Granada CF. Following June it was prolonged for one more year.  On 17 April 2020 it was informed that Huétor Vega would not renew the agreement, which ended on 30 June 2020.

Season to season

5 seasons in Tercera División
1 season in Tercera División RFEF

Notes

References

Association football clubs established in 1927
Football clubs in Andalusia
Divisiones Regionales de Fútbol clubs
1927 establishments in Spain
Province of Granada
Granada CF